Full English is an adult animated sitcom created by Jack Williams, Harry Williams and Alex Scarfe for Channel 4. The programme was produced by Two Brothers Pictures. It parodies and satirises various popular entertainment personalities in the United Kingdom.

Full English first aired on 12 November 2012, with the first series ending abruptly on 10 December 2012 after the final episode, due to air on 17 December 2012, was pulled from the schedules. The show has been cancelled according to the official Facebook page.

Background
Full English is set in the heart of British suburbia.

Edgar, a put upon wage slave, works for his self-obsessed, borderline-evil father-in-law Ken Lavender. Married to houseproud wife Wendy, they are parents to three very different children, man-child Dusty, amiable and dimwitted Jason and 'Emo' Eve.

Created, produced and written by brothers Harry & Jack Williams, the show is made using hand-drawn animation, with all the characters and sets created by the artist Alex Scarfe – each frame is individually drawn before being scanned into a computer using Toon Boom Harmony, which gives it a realistic depth. This work is done by Rough Draft Studios in Los Angeles and South Korea, and is the first show were they are credited as a production company.

Characters
 Edgar Johnson (Richard Ayoade) – the patriarch of the Johnson family, husband to Wendy and father to Dusty, Jason and Eve. He is a nerdy, bespectacled man in his late-40s  who is a coward and runs away in the first signs of conflict or danger. He is shy and often sexually frustrated. Edgar is employed by his father-in-law, Ken, at his confectionery company Sweet Lavender, even though Ken believes his daughter, Wendy, is too good for him.
 Wendy Johnson (Rosie Cavaliero) – the wife of Edgar and the mother of Dusty, Jason and Eve, a housewife in her mid-50s who tires of minding after her family, as she is often the only one capable of doing so. She is not unhappy with her home life, it just leaves her feeling unfulfilled. Wendy is the apple of her father, Ken's, eye.
 Dusty Johnson (Kayvan Novak) – the eldest son of the family, a lazy, obese man-child who still lives at home with his parents, to their despair. He is imaginative and not unintelligent but dimwitted, lisping and overly optimistic about his own ideas. The rest of the family is content to leave him to his own fantasy world. In episode 4 it was revealed Dusty is 30 years old, despite his age being stated as 28 on the Channel 4 website as well as shown on episode 3.
 Jason Johnson (Kayvan Novak) – the 17-year-old middle child, is an amiable, jocular lad, generally kind but stupid. In episode 2, it was hinted that he could be gay.
 Evelyn "Eve" Johnson (Daisy Haggard) – the youngest of the Johnson children. She is 14 years old, fat and an emo (or a Goth, it is unclear) who struggles with her diet and social life. She is moody, surly and monosyllabic towards her family, but shows a fanciful and romantic side in other contexts. She is also the lead vocalist of a punk band, Bloodmonkey.
 Ken Lavender (Oliver Maltman) – is the egotistical ageing lothario and self-made millionaire owner of Sweet Lavender confectionery company, as well as the father of Wendy Johnson. He has lived a full and exciting life and does not care who he 'screws over' on his way to the top. He loves his daughter dearly but despises her hapless husband, Edgar.
 Squidge (Kayvan Novak) – a huge, green balloon-like creature, and purely a figment of Ken's imagination. His squeaking voice masks a wildly amoral nature, and he often eggs Ken on to do terrible things; the official website suggests that Squidge could be a manifestation of Ken's evil side.
 Various other characters in the show are voiced by series regulars: Simon Greenall, Lucy Montgomery and Darren Boyd.

Episodes

Full English adventure game
A free Flash adventure game was released to promote the show. Developed by Leamington Spa digital agency fish in a bottle, it is a multi-chapter game that is meant to introduce the characters, and features the full voice cast from the show.

The game received positive reviews, with Mike Rose of review site Gamezebo stating, "Full English may be a simply point-and-clicker, but it's good fun and the parodies are often delicious."

Reception
Full English was universally panned by critics, most pointing out the show's poor attempt to emulate American adult animated shows, notably the uncanny character resemblances to Family Guy, as well as the poor art designs of the characters in general. On the character designs, Harry Venning of The Stage wrote: "The animation is flat and uninteresting, while the characters' faces are ugly and unappealing."

More positive reviews came from Sam Wollaston of The Guardian, who wrote "I think it's hilarious." and The Metro describing Full English as: "It's rough around the edges but it does have the requisite dysfunctional family at its filthy heart".

References

External links

2010s American adult animated television series
2010s American animated comedy television series
2010s American satirical television series
2010s American sitcoms
2012 American television series debuts
2012 American television series endings
2010s British adult animated television series
2010s British animated comedy television series
2010s British satirical television series
2010s British sitcoms
2012 British television series debuts
2012 British television series endings
American adult animated comedy television series
American animated sitcoms
British adult animated comedy television series
Animated satirical television series
English-language television shows
Channel 4 comedy
British culture
Animated television series about dysfunctional families
Unaired television episodes
Television series by Rough Draft Studios